The fifth season of Packed to the Rafters, an Australian drama television series premiered on 17 April 2012 on the Seven Network. There were 22 episodes. The Seven network put the series on hiatus again on June 19, 2012 after 10 episodes, despite previously promising that viewers would see a full season run. The show returned on 29 January 2013 with episode 11, accompanied by an increase in viewers compared to previous episodes of the season.

Production 
Packed to the Rafters was renewed for a fifth season with production on the episodes beginning from October 2011. Hugh Sheridan, who played Ben Rafter, filmed his final scenes for the fifth season in February 2012, before leaving the show. Angus McLaren, who played Nathan Rafter, took some time off during the fifth season and returned mid season in the 100th episode.

Cast

Main cast 
 Rebecca Gibney as Julie Rafter
 Erik Thomson as Dave Rafter
 Hugh Sheridan as Ben Rafter (13 episodes)
 Angus McLaren as Nathan Rafter (3 episodes)
 George Houvardas as Carbo Karandonis
 James Stewart as Jake Barton
 Ryan Corr as Coby Jennings
 Hannah Marshall as Retta Schembri-Karandonis
 Michael Caton as Ted Taylor

Recurring 
 Hannah & Sabella Storey as Ruby Rafter
 Jacob Allen as Matt Jennings
 Merridy Eastman as Donna Mackey (21 episodes)
 Zoe Cramond as Emma Mackey (21 episodes)
 Brooke Satchwell as Frankie Calasso (21 episodes)

Guest 
 Samantha Tolj as Sian Perry (12 episodes)
 Cameron Daddo as Adam Goodman (8 episodes)
 Andy Anderson as Jim Barton (5 episodes)
 Kristian Schmid as Alex Barton (4 episodes)
 Olivia Stambouliah as Voula Karandonis (4 episodes)
 Mark Lee as Duncan Galloway (4 episodes)
 Henry Nixon as Bryn Perry (3 episodes)
 Holly Fraser as Elisha (2 episodes)
 Lauren Clair as Saskia Clark Rafter (2 episodes)
 Steve Vidler as Mark Mackey (2 episodes)
 Zoe Ventoura as Mel Bannon (1 episode)

Hugh Sheridan's departure
Hugh Sheridan, who plays Ben Rafter, announced on 15 May 2012 that the fifth season would be their last season of Packed to the Rafters as a main cast member. Their final episode aired 5 February 2013, the series 100th episode. Sheridan returned for two episodes in season six.

Episodes

{| class="wikitable plainrowheaders" style="width:100%;"
|-style="color:white"
!! style="background-color:#5b3695; color: #fff; text-align: center;" width=5%|No. inseries
!! style="background-color:#5b3695; color: #fff; text-align: center;" width=5%|No. inseason
!! style="background-color:#5b3695; color: #fff; text-align: center;" width=20%|Title
!! style="background-color:#5b3695; color: #fff; text-align: center;" width=15%| Narrator
!! style="background-color:#5b3695; color: #fff; text-align: center;" width=15%|Directed by
!! style="background-color:#5b3695; color: #fff; text-align: center;" width=25%|Written by
!! style="background-color:#5b3695; color: #fff; text-align: center;" width=10%|Original air date
!! style="background-color:#5b3695; color: #fff; text-align: center;" width=5%|Australian viewers
|-

|}

Reception

Ratings for season five were significantly lower compared with previous seasons, attributed to two hiatuses during season four by the Seven network and competition from the Nine Network's The Voice. However, upon returning with episode 11 in 2013, the ratings once again increased.

Ratings
s
1 Viewer numbers are based on preliminary OzTAM data for Sydney, Melbourne, Brisbane, Adelaide and Perth combined.

References

2012 Australian television seasons